Ghazi Faisal Salah (born 1965) is an Iraqi wrestler. He competed in the men's Greco-Roman 57 kg at the 1988 Summer Olympics.

References

1965 births
Living people
Iraqi male sport wrestlers
Olympic wrestlers of Iraq
Wrestlers at the 1988 Summer Olympics
Place of birth missing (living people)